The UCI Cyclo-cross World Championships are the world championships for cyclo-cross organised by the Union Cycliste Internationale (UCI). Starting in 2020, six events are organized each year – men's elite, women's elite, men's under 23, women's under 23, men's under 18 (Men's Juniors), and women's under 18 (Women's Juniors). Traditionally, the elite events are held on a Sunday with the other events held on the Saturday the day before.

The UCI awards a gold medal and a rainbow jersey to the winner. Silver and bronze medals are awarded to the second and third place contestants. World champions wear their rainbow jersey until the following year's championship, but they may wear it only in the type of event in which they won it.

History

First held in 1950 it replaced the Critérium International de Cyclo-cross (French for International Cyclo-cross Criterium) which, as the first international cyclo-cross race, was considered the unofficial world championship.
It has since been held annually and is traditionally disputed at the end of January or the beginning of February.
At first there was only the event for elite men. Events for junior and under 23 men were added in 1979 and 1996 respectively; women's events were added for the elites and under 23s in 2000 and 2016 respectively.
Beyond these, there also was an event for amateurs from 1967 till 1993.

Cyclo-cross being mostly centred in Europe has made it take quite a while for the world championships to be held in another continent.
This changed with the 2013 edition which took place in Louisville, Kentucky, United States.

Current champions (as of 2022/2023)

Championships

Results
 Women's elite race
 Men's elite race
 Women's under-23 race
 Men's under-23 race
 Junior women's race
 Junior men's race

See also
  Belgium at the UCI Cyclo-cross World Championships
  European Cyclo-cross Championships

References

External links

 
Cyclo-cross races
Cyclo-cross
Recurring sporting events established in 1950